The 2022–23 Vanderbilt Commodores men's basketball team represents Vanderbilt University during the 2022–23 NCAA Division I men's basketball season. The team is led by fourth-year head coach Jerry Stackhouse, and plays their home games at Memorial Gymnasium in Nashville, Tennessee as a member of the Southeastern Conference.

Previous season
The Commodores finished the 2021–22 season 19–16, 7–11 in SEC Play to finish in 11th place. They defeated Georgia and Alabama to advance to the quarterfinals of the SEC tournament where they lost to Kentucky. They received an at-large bid to the National Invitation Tournament where they defeated Belmont and Dayton before losing to Xavier in the quarterfinals.

Offseason

Departures

Incoming transfers

Recruiting classes

2022 recruiting class

2023 recruiting class

Roster

Schedule and results

|-
!colspan=12 style=""| Non-conference regular season

|-
!colspan=12 style=""| SEC regular season

|-
!colspan=12 style=""| SEC tournament

|-
!colspan=12 style=""| NIT

Source

See also
2022–23 Vanderbilt Commodores women's basketball team

References

Vanderbilt Commodores men's basketball seasons
Vanderbilt Commodores
Vanderbilt Commodores men's basketball
Vanderbilt Commodores men's basketball
Vanderbilt